The American Legion, commonly known as the Legion, is a non-profit organization of U.S. war veterans headquartered in Indianapolis, Indiana. It is made up of state, U.S. territory, and overseas departments, and these are in turn made up of local posts. The organization was formed on March 15, 1919, in Paris, France, by a thousand officers and men of the American Expeditionary Forces (A. E. F.), and it was chartered on September 16, 1919, by the United States Congress.

The Legion played the leading role in drafting and passing the Servicemen's Readjustment Act of 1944, commonly known as the "G.I. Bill". In addition to organizing commemorative events, members provide assistance at Department of Veterans Affairs (VA) hospitals and clinics. It is active in issue-oriented U.S. politics. Its primary political activity is lobbying on behalf of interests of veterans and service members, including support for benefits such as pensions and the Veterans Health Administration. It has also historically promoted Americanism, individual obligation to the community, state, and nation; peace and good will.

History 

The American Legion was established on March 15, 1919, in Paris, France, by delegates to a caucus meeting from units of the American Expeditionary Forces (A. E. F.), which adopted a tentative constitution. The action of the Paris Caucus was confirmed and endorsed by a similar meeting held in St. Louis, Missouri, from May 8 to 10, 1919, when the Legion was formally recognized by the troops who served in the United States. The Paris Caucus appointed an Executive Committee of seventeen officers and men to represent the troops in France in the conduct of the Legion. The St. Louis caucus appointed a similar Committee of Seventeen. These two national executive committees amalgamated and were the initial governing body of the Legion. The temporary headquarters was located in New York.

List of founding members

The men who initiated the formation of the Legion:

 Lieutenant Colonel Theodore Roosevelt, Jr., of the First Division
 Colonel Henry D. Lindsley, formerly Mayor of Dallas, Texas
 Colonel Horatio Nelson Jackson, US Army first person to drive an automobile across America
 Sergeant John J. Sullivan, of Seattle
 Lieutenant Colonel Franklin D'Olier, of Philadelphia
 Ex-Senator Luke Lea, of Tennessee
 Lieutenant Colonel Frederick Huidekoper, of Washington, D.C.
 Major Redmond C. Stewart, of Baltimore
 Wagoner Dale Shaw, of Iowa
 Lieutenant Colonel George A. White, of Oregon
 "Bill" Donovan, of the "Fighting 69th"
 Major Thomas R. Gowenlock, of Illinois
 Lieutenant Earl B. Dickerson, of the 92nd Division
 Sergeant Alvin York, of Tennessee
 Colonel John Price Jackson, of the S. O. S.
 Lieutenant Colonel "Jack" Greenway, of Arizona
 Sergeant Roy C. Haines, of Maine
 G. Edward Buxton, Jr., of Rhode Island
 Eric Fisher Wood, of Pennsylvania
 Chaplain John W. Inzer, of Alabama
 Lieutenant Colonel David M. Goodrich, of Akron
 Chief Petty Officer B. J. Goldberg, of Chicago
 "Tom" Miller, of Delaware
 Major Alex. Laughlin, Jr., of Pittsburgh
 Major Henry Leonard, of the Marine Corps
 Dwight F. Davis, of the 35th Division
 Corporal Charles S. Pew, of Montana
 Brigadier General William G. Price, of the 28th Division
 Bishop Charles H. Brent, Senior Chaplain of the A. E. F.
 Major General John F. O'Ryan, of the 27th Division
 Stewart Edward White, of California
 Private Jesus M. Baca, of New Mexico
 Brigadier General Charles H. Cole, of the 26th Division
 Sergeant E. L. Malsbary, of Nevada
 Lieutenant Samuel Gompers, Jr., of New York
 Colonel Henry L. Stimson, Ex-Secretary of War
 Lieutenant Colonel Charles W. Whittlesey, Commander of the "Lost Battalion"
 Roy Hoffman, of Oklahoma
 Lieutenant Colonel A. Piatt Andrew, of the American Ambulance in France
 Brigadier General Harvey J. Moss, of the State of Washington
 John MacVicar, Mayor of Des Moines before the War
 Sergeant George H. H. Pratt, of New Orleans
 Colonel F. W. Galbraith, of Cincinnati
 Corporal Joseph H. Fountain, of Vermont
 Devereux Milburn, of the 78th Division
 Lieutenant Colonel Wilbur Smith, of the 89th Division
 Sergeant Theodore Myers, of Pennsylvania
 Colonel Bennett C. Clark, son of Champ Clark
 Robert Bacon, Ex-Secretary of State

Headquarters 

The national headquarters, informally known as American Legion headquarters, is located on the Indiana World War Memorial Plaza at 700 North Pennsylvania Street, Indianapolis, Indiana. It is the headquarters for the National Commander of The American Legion and also houses the archives, library, Membership, Internal Affairs, Public Relations, and The American Legion magazine's editorial offices. The national headquarters has expanded multiple times since its establishment.

Emblem
The World War I Victory Button on a narrow circular band of blue enamel, containing the words "American Legion" in gold letters, forms the central element of the American Legion Emblem. The Legion emblem or "button" was officially adopted by the National Executive Committee of The American Legion on July 9, 1919.

Eligibility 
Membership in The American Legion was originally restricted to soldiers, sailors, and marines who served honorably between April 6, 1917, and November 11, 1918. Eligibility has since been expanded to include personnel who served on active duty in the Armed Forces of the United States or armed forces associated with the U.S., between December 7, 1941, through a date of cessation of hostilities as determined by the federal government, and was an American citizen when they entered that service or continues to serve honorably. U.S. Merchant Marines who served between December 7, 1941, and December 31, 1946, are also eligible. Honorary, associate, social, or guest memberships in the Legion are not permitted. Members must be eligible through the nature and timing of their military service.

The following is a list of eligibility dates used by The American Legion to determine membership eligibility.

Publication 
The official publication, originally known as The American Legion Weekly, launched on July 4, 1919. In 1926, the Legion Weekly switched frequency of publication and was renamed The American Legion Monthly. In 1936 the publication's name and volume numbering system changed again, this time to The American Legion.

Notable members 

Notable members of The American Legion have included:

List of national commanders 

 Franklin D'Olier, of Pennsylvania, 1919–1920
 Frederic W. Galbraith, Jr., of Ohio, 1920–1921
 John G. Emery, of Michigan, 1921
 Hanford MacNider, of Iowa, 1921–1922
 Alvin M. Owsley, of Texas, 1922–1923
 John R. Quinn, of California, 1923–1924
 James A. Drain, of Washington, 1924–1925
 John R. McQuigg, of Ohio, 1925–1926
 Howard P. Savage, of Illinois, 1926–1927
 Edward E. Spafford, of New York, 1927–1928
 Paul V. McNutt, of Indiana, 1928–1929
 O. L. Bodenhamer, of Arkansas, 1929–1930
 Ralph T. O'Neil, of Kansas, 1930–1931
 Henry L. Stevens, Jr., of North Carolina, 1931–1932
 Louis A. Johnson, of West Virginia, 1932–1933
 Edward A. Hayes, of Illinois, 1933–1934
 Frank N. Belgrano, of California, 1934–1935
 Ray Murphy, of Iowa, 1935–1936
 Harry W. Colmery, of Kansas, 1936–1937
 Daniel J. Doherty, of Massachusetts, 1937–1938
 Stephen F. Chadwick, of Washington, 1938–1939
 Raymond J. Kelly, of Michigan, 1939–1940
 Milo J. Warner, of Ohio, 1940–1941
 Lynn U. Stambaugh, of North Dakota, 1941–1942
 Roane Waring, of Tennessee, 1942–1943
 Warren H. Atherton, of California, 1943–1944
 Edward N. Scheiberling, of New York, 1944–1945
 John Stelle, of Illinois, 1945–1946
 Paul H. Griffith, of Pennsylvania, 1946–1947
 James F. O'Neill, of New Hampshire, 1947–1948
 S. Perry Brown, of Texas, 1948–1949
 George N. Craig, of Indiana, 1949–1950
 Erle Cocke, Jr., of Georgia, 1950–1951
 Donald R. Wilson, of West Virginia, 1951–1952
 Lewis K. Gough, of California, 1952–1953
 Arthur J. Connell, of Connecticut, 1953–1954
 Seaborn P. Collins, of New Mexico, 1954–1955
 J. Addington Wagner, of Michigan, 1955–1956
 Dan Daniel, of Virginia, 1956–1957
 John S. Gleason, Jr., of Illinois, 1957–1958
 Preston J. Moore, of Oklahoma, 1958–1959
 Martin B. McKneally, of New York, 1959–1960
 William R. Burke, of California, 1960–1961
 Charles L. Bacon, of Missouri, 1961–1962
 James E. Powers, of Georgia, 1962–1963
 Daniel F. Foley, of Minnesota, 1963–1964
 Donald E. Johnson, of Iowa, 1964–1965
 L. Eldon James, of Virginia, 1965–1966
 John E. Davis, of North Dakota, 1966–1967
 William E. Galbraith, of Nebraska, 1967–1968
 William C. Doyle, of New Jersey, 1968–1969
 J. Milton Patrick, of Oklahoma, 1969–1970
 Alfred P. Chamie, of California, 1970–1971
 John H. Geiger, of Illinois, 1971–1972
 Joe L. Matthews, of Texas, 1972–1973
 Robert E. L. Eaton, of Maryland, 1972–1973
 James M. Wagonseller, of Ohio, 1974–1975
 Harry G. Wiles, of Kansas, 1975–1976
 William J. Rogers, of Maine, 1976–1977
 Robert C. Smith, of Louisiana, 1977–1978
 John M. Carey, of Michigan, 1978–1979
 Frank I. Hamilton, of Indiana, 1979–1980
 Michael J. Kogutek, of New York, 1980–1981
 Jack W. Flynt, of Texas, 1981–1982
 Al Keller, Jr., of Illinois, 1982–1983
 Keith A. Kreul, of Wisconsin, 1983–1984
 Clarence M. Bacon, of Maryland, 1984–1985
 Dale L. Renaud, of Iowa, 1985–1986
 James P. Dean, of Mississippi, 1986–1987
 John P. Comer, of Massachusetts, 1987–1988
 H. F. Gierke III, of North Dakota, 1988–1989
 Miles S. Epling, of West Virginia, 1989–1990
 Robert S. Turner, of Georgia, 1990–1991
 Dominic D. DiFrancesco, of Pennsylvania, 1991–1992
 Roger A. Munson, of Ohio, 1992–1993
 Bruce Thiesen, of California, 1993–1994
 William M. Detweiler, of Louisiana, 1994–1995
 Daniel A. Ludwig, of Minnesota, 1995–1996
 Joseph J. Frank, of Missouri, 1996–1997
 Anthony G. Jordan, of Maine, 1997–1998
 Harold L. Miller, of Virginia, 1998–1999
 Alan G. Lance, Sr., of Idaho, 1999–2000
 Ray G. Smith, of North Carolina, 2000–2001
 Richard J. Santos, of Maryland, 2001–2002
 Ronald F. Conley, of Pennsylvania, 2002–2003
 John A. Brieden III, of Texas, 2003–2004
 Thomas P. Cadmus, of Michigan, 2004–2005
 Thomas L. Bock, of Colorado, 2005–2006
 Paul A. Morin, of Massachusetts, 2006–2007
 Martin F. Conatser, of Illinois, 2007–2008
 David K. Rehbein, of Iowa, 2008–2009
 Clarence E. Hill, of Florida, 2009–2010
 Jimmie L. Foster, of Alaska, 2010–2011
 Fang A. Wong, of New York, 2011–2012
 James E. Koutz, of Indiana, 2012–2013
 Daniel Dellinger, of Virginia, 2013–2014
 Michael D. Helm, of Nebraska, 2014–2015
 Dale Barnett, of Georgia, 2015–2016 
 Charles E. Schmidt, of Oregon, 2016–2017
 Denise H. Rohan, of Wisconsin, 2017–2018
 Brett P. Reistad, of Virginia, 2018–2019
 James W. Oxford, of North Carolina, 2019–2021
 Paul E. Dillard, of Texas, 2021–2022
 Vincent J. Troiola, of New York, 2022–2023

List of honorary commanders
 Marshal Ferdinand Foch, of the French Army
 General John J. Pershing, Commander in Chief of the A. E. F.

List of past national commanders by vote of national conventions 

 Henry D. Lindsley, of Texas, 1919
 Milton J. Foreman, of Illinois, 1921
 Bennett Champ Clark, of Missouri, 1926
 Theodore Roosevelt, Jr., of New York, 1949
 Eric Fisher Wood, of Pennsylvania, 1955
 Thomas W. Miller, of Nevada, 1968
 Maurice Stember, of New York, 1975
 Hamilton Fish III, of New York, 1979
 E. Roy Stone, Jr., of South Carolina, 1987
 Robert W. Spanogle, of Michigan, 2008

See also 

Freedom Bell, American Legion
List of members of the American Legion
List of veterans' organizations

References

Citations

General sources

Further reading

External links 

 Official
 
 General information
 
 American Legion politician members at The Political Graveyard
 The American Legion Centennial Celebration
 
 Archives
 Washington American Legion Records, 1919–1920. 4 microfilm reels. At the Labor Archives of Washington, University of Washington Libraries Special Collections. 
 Stephen Fowler Chadwick Papers, 1917–1974. 21.1 cubic feet. At the Labor Archives of Washington, University of Washington Libraries Special Collections.

 
1919 establishments in France
501(c)(19) nonprofit organizations
Advocacy groups in the United States
Aftermath of World War I in France
Aftermath of World War I in the United States
American veterans' organizations
Charities based in Indiana
Lobbying organizations in the United States
Magazine publishing companies of the United States
Nonpartisan organizations in the United States
Non-profit organizations based in Indianapolis
Organizations established in 1919
Patriotic and national organizations chartered by the United States Congress
Service organizations based in the United States
United States military support organizations